Essen-Kray Nord is a railway station on the Essen–Gelsenkirchen railway situated in Essen in western Germany. It is classified by Deutsche Bahn as a category 6 station. It is served by Rhine-Ruhr S-Bahn line S 2 and by bus routes 144 (Steele – Annental – Stadtwaldplatz), 146 (Leithe Wackenberg + Essen Hbf – Stadtwald – Heisingen), 147 (Porscheplatz – Haarzopf Erbach + Grimbergstr), 170 (Steele + Schonnebeck – Katernberg – Altenessen – Borbeck) and 194 (Gelsenkirchen Hbf + Steele – Stadtwald – Haarzopf) operated by Ruhrbahn.

References 

S2 (Rhine-Ruhr S-Bahn)
Rhine-Ruhr S-Bahn stations
Kray Nord
Railway stations in Germany opened in 1872